This is a list of 127 species in Mycodrosophila, a genus of vinegar flies in the family Drosophilidae.

Mycodrosophila species

 Mycodrosophila aciliata Okada, 1986 c g
 Mycodrosophila adyala Burla, 1954 c g
 Mycodrosophila albicornis (Meijere, 1916) c g
 Mycodrosophila alienata Duda, 1926 c g
 Mycodrosophila amabilis (Meijere, 1911) c g
 Mycodrosophila ampularia Chen, Shao & Fan, 1989 c g
 Mycodrosophila angularis Okada, 1986 c g
 Mycodrosophila annulata Bock, 1980 c g
 Mycodrosophila annulipes Okada, 1986 c g
 Mycodrosophila aqua Bock, 1980 c g
 Mycodrosophila argentifrons Malloch, 1927 c g
 Mycodrosophila atie Burla, 1954 c g
 Mycodrosophila atrithorax Okada, 1968 c g
 Mycodrosophila barracloughi Chassagnard & Tsacas, 1998 c g
 Mycodrosophila basalis Okada, 1956 c g
 Mycodrosophila biceps Kang, Lee & Bahng, 1966 c g
 Mycodrosophila bicolor Okada, 1986 c g
 Mycodrosophila bifibulata Takada, 1968 c g
 Mycodrosophila biroi Duda, 1923 c g
 Mycodrosophila boudinoti Tsacas & Chassagnard, 1991 c g
 Mycodrosophila brunnescens Wheeler & Takada, 1963 c g
 Mycodrosophila buxtoni Malloch, 1934 c g
 Mycodrosophila caesia McEvey, 2005 c g
 Mycodrosophila calceus Okada, 1986 c g
 Mycodrosophila carinata Bock, 1980 c g
 Mycodrosophila carola Wheeler & Takada, 1964 c g
 Mycodrosophila celesta Sidorenko, 1992 c g
 Mycodrosophila chazeaui Tsacas & Chassagnard, 1991 c g
 Mycodrosophila ciliatipes Duda, 1923 c g
 Mycodrosophila ciliophora Okada, 1986 c g
 Mycodrosophila claudensis Bock, 1980 c g
 Mycodrosophila claytonae Wheeler & Takada, 1963 i c g b
 Mycodrosophila compacta Bock, 1980 c g
 Mycodrosophila coralloides Chen, Shao & Fan, 1989 c g
 Mycodrosophila cornea Okada, 1986 c g
 Mycodrosophila costata Okada, 1986 c g
 Mycodrosophila delta McEvey, 2005 c g
 Mycodrosophila dianae Bock, 1980 c g
 Mycodrosophila dimidiata (Loew, 1862) i c g b
 Mycodrosophila ditan Burla, 1954 c g
 Mycodrosophila diversa Bock, 1980 c g
 Mycodrosophila dudleyi Chassagnard & Tsacas, 1997 c g
 Mycodrosophila echinacea Chen, Shao & Fan, 1989 c g
 Mycodrosophila elegans Wheeler & Takada, 1963 c g
 Mycodrosophila erecta Okada, 1968 c g
 Mycodrosophila esakii Wheeler & Takada, 1964 c g
 Mycodrosophila fascinata McEvey, 2005 c g
 Mycodrosophila flavilumbus Okada, 1986 c g
 Mycodrosophila fracticosta (Lamb, 1914) c g
 Mycodrosophila fumusala Lin & Ting, 1971 c g
 Mycodrosophila gaku Burla, 1954 c g
 Mycodrosophila gordoni McEvey & Bock, 1982 c g
 Mycodrosophila gracilis Okada, 1986 c g
 Mycodrosophila grandifrons McEvey & Bock, 1982 c g
 Mycodrosophila gratiosa (Meijere, 1911) c g
 Mycodrosophila gressitti Wheeler & Takada, 1964 c g
 Mycodrosophila halterata Malloch, 1930 c g
 Mycodrosophila helenae Bock, 1980 c g
 Mycodrosophila heterothrix McEvey & Bock, 1982 c g
 Mycodrosophila huangshanensis Chen & Toda, 1994 c g
 Mycodrosophila japonica Okada, 1956 c g
 Mycodrosophila joalahae Bock, 1982 c g
 Mycodrosophila kabakolo Burla, 1954 c g
 Mycodrosophila kitagawai Wynn & Toda, 1990 c g
 Mycodrosophila koreana Lee & Takada, 1959 c g
 Mycodrosophila kuntii Kumar & Gupta, 1992 c g
 Mycodrosophila legrandi Tsacas & Chassagnard, 1991 c g
 Mycodrosophila longicornis Seguy, 1933 c g
 Mycodrosophila malayana Okada, 1986 c g
 Mycodrosophila margoae Bock, 1980 c g
 Mycodrosophila marksae Bock, 1980 c g
 Mycodrosophila matilei Chassagnard & Lachaise, 2000 c g
 Mycodrosophila melaniae McEvey, 2005 c g
 Mycodrosophila melanophaea Tsacas, 1990 c g
 Mycodrosophila melanopleura Sundaran & Gupta, 1991 c g
 Mycodrosophila minor Bock, 1980 c g
 Mycodrosophila missima Okada, 1986 c g
 Mycodrosophila mulgravensis Bock, 1980 c g
 Mycodrosophila multidentata Okada, 1986 c g
 Mycodrosophila neoprojectans Wheeler & Takada, 1963 c g
 Mycodrosophila nigerrima (Lamb, 1914) c g
 Mycodrosophila nigrans Chassagnard & Tsacas, 1997 c g
 Mycodrosophila nigrithorax Malloch, 1934 c g
 Mycodrosophila nigrobrunnea (Lamb, 1914) c g
 Mycodrosophila nigropleura Wheeler & Takada, 1963 c g
 Mycodrosophila nigropleurata Takada & Momma, 1975 c g
 Mycodrosophila nigropteropleura Kang, Lee & Bahng, 1965 c g
 Mycodrosophila ocellata McEvey, 2005 c g
 Mycodrosophila ohbai Wynn & Toda, 1990 c g
 Mycodrosophila palmata Okada, 1956 c g
 Mycodrosophila palpalis McEvey, 2005 c g
 Mycodrosophila papuana Okada, 1986 c g
 Mycodrosophila parallelinervis Duda, 1926 c g
 Mycodrosophila penihispidus Sundaran & Gupta, 1991 c g
 Mycodrosophila planata McEvey, 2005 c g
 Mycodrosophila planipalpis Kang, Lee & Bahng, 1966 c g
 Mycodrosophila poecilogastra (Loew, 1874) c g
 Mycodrosophila ponapeae Wheeler & Takada, 1964 c g
 Mycodrosophila projectans (Sturtevant, 1916) c g
 Mycodrosophila pseudoprojectans Wheeler & Takada, 1963 c g
 Mycodrosophila punctata Tsacas, 1990 c g
 Mycodrosophila quadrata Okada, 1986 c g
 Mycodrosophila rayi Bock, 1980 c g
 Mycodrosophila recula Wheeler & Kambysellis, 1966 c g
 Mycodrosophila rika Sidorenko, 1999 c g
 Mycodrosophila rosemaryae Bock, 1980 c g
 Mycodrosophila scotos Bock, 1980 c g
 Mycodrosophila separata (Meijere, 1911) c g
 Mycodrosophila serrata Okada, 1986 c g
 Mycodrosophila setipalpis Okada, 1956 c g
 Mycodrosophila shikokuana Okada, 1956 c g
 Mycodrosophila simplex Bock, 1980 c g
 Mycodrosophila spinata Okada, 1986 c g
 Mycodrosophila stalkeri Wheeler and Takada, 1963 i c g
 Mycodrosophila stigma Bock, 1980 c g
 Mycodrosophila stylaria Chen & Okada, 1989 c g
 Mycodrosophila subciliatipes Okada, 1986 c g
 Mycodrosophila subgratiosa Okada, 1965 c g
 Mycodrosophila suluma Burla, 1954 c g
 Mycodrosophila sunguru Burla, 1954 c g
 Mycodrosophila takachihonis Okada, 1956 c g
 Mycodrosophila tillieri Tsacas & Chassagnard, 1991 c g
 Mycodrosophila umbra McEvey, 2005 c g
 Mycodrosophila vannuatuae McEvey, 2005 c g
 Mycodrosophila variata Bock, 1980 c g
 Mycodrosophila wassermani Wheeler & Takada, 1964 c g
 Mycodrosophila xanthopleura Sundaran & Gupta, 1991 c g

Data sources: i = ITIS, c = Catalogue of Life, g = GBIF, b = Bugguide.net

References

Mycodrosophila
Articles created by Qbugbot